Herman Tilden Tripp (August 6, 1859 – July 5, 1939) was an Alaskan politician, including mayor of Juneau, Alaska from 1906 to 1907.  He was also a Republican member of the First Alaska Territorial Senate from 1913 to 1914, and a member of the Fifth Alaska Territorial House of Representatives, from 1921 to 1922.  For both terms, he represented Juneau.

External links
 Alaska's First Legislature, 1913
 Herman Tripp at 100 Years of Alaska's Legislature

1859 births
1939 deaths
20th-century American politicians
Alaska Republicans
American mining engineers
Burials at Evergreen Cemetery (Juneau, Alaska)
Mayors of Juneau, Alaska
Members of the Alaska Territorial Legislature